Raja Veda Kavya Patasala is a Patasala also Paathasala (school) located at Kumbakonam, Thanjavur district of Tamil Nadu, India.

Location
It is located on the southern banks of the Cauvery river.

History
By the efforts of Govinda Dikshitar this Patasala was established. His other monumental works are the gopura and granary of Palaivananathar Temple,  new shrines and gopura of  Kumbeswarar Temple, and  Ramaswamy Temple. Established in 1542 CE, this Patasala produced eminent scholars. To main this, in 1972 CE Advaitha Vidyacharya Maharaja Sahib Sri Govindha Dikshitar Punya Smarana Smriti was set up. The primary aim of this institution is to impart the knowledge of VEDAS and Sastric studies.  This Patasala is continuing its services for the past 473 year without interruption.  The three sects Smartha,Vaishnava and Madhwa without any discrimination undergo their respective Vedic studies here. The 480th annual day was celebrated on 8 May 2022.

Classes
In this Patasala, classes are taken on four vedas for eight and ten years and certificates are issued to students. A student can continue his study in this institution, along with School education.

Renovation
This was renovated in 1933 CE and on 1 November 2015.

References

External links
 கோவிந்த தீட்சிதரும் மகாமகக்குளமும், தினமலர் கோயில்கள்
 Geetha Venktaraman, Four centuries and after, The Hindu, 7 May 2015
 Raja Veda Kavya Patasala - Kumbakonam, Tamil Gnanaboomi, 14 Aug 2019

Education in Thanjavur district
1542 establishments in India
Kumbakonam
Vedas
Hindu studies